Hadi Shariati (born 1980) is an Iranian director and screenwriter. He received the Best Screenplay Award from the International Film Festival for Children and Youth for his film Inside the Waves. He has won awards from the Queen Palm International Film Festival and LAKECITY International Film Festival for his documentary film Sarah which is about his daughter who is not able to see.

Filmography
 Sarah
 Raghse Aftab
 Inside the Waves
 Familiar Voice

References

External links 
 

Iranian film directors
Persian-language film directors
People from Najafabad
1980 births
Living people
Iranian documentary filmmakers